Alushta City Municipality, officially "the territory governed by the Alushta city council", also known as Greater Alushta is one of the 25 regions of the Autonomous Republic of Crimea, a territory recognized by a majority of countries as part of Ukraine but incorporated by Russia as the Republic of Crimea. Population: 

It is a resort region, located at the southern shore of Crimea - one of the most famous recreational territories of the former Soviet Union.

Administrative and municipal status
Within the framework of administrative divisions of Russia, Alushta is, together with a number of urban and rural localities, incorporated separately as the town of republican significance of Alushta—an administrative unit with the status equal to that of the districts. As a municipal division, the town of republican significance of Alushta is incorporated as Alushta Urban Okrug.

Within the framework of administrative divisions of Ukraine, Alushta is incorporated as the town of republican significance of Alushta. Ukraine does not have municipal divisions.

Besides the city of Alushta the region includes the town of Partenit and 24 villages which are organized into 6 communities.

Former Crimean Tatar names which were officially changed in 1945-49 and are now used only by the Crimean Tatar community are mentioned in brackets.

Sister cities
The following cities are twinned with Alushta:
  Äänekoski, Central Finland
  Santa Cruz, California, United States
  Jūrmala, Latvia
  Dzierżoniów, Poland

References

 
Municipalities of Crimea